The 2010s was a decade of the Gregorian calendar that began on January 1, 2010, and ended on December 31, 2019. For Bangladesh this decade was characterized by political stability from continued rule of Sheikh Hasina led Awami League Government. While the country made significant economic growth in this decade, rising threat from Islamist terrorism and Rohingya refugee problem marred the progress.

Politics and National life

The decade began with Awami League government in power. The infamous BDR Mutiny has just been subdued and the trial of war crimes committed during Bangladesh Liberation War have begun. In 2010, the Supreme Court of Bangladesh reaffirmed secularism as a fundamental principle in the constitution. The war crimes tribunal mobilised public opinion in favour of secularism, which was manifested in the March 2013 Shahbag protests. In response, a huge Islamist mobilisation also took place led by the Hefazat-e-Islam group in May 2013.

The intense bickering between the League and BNP, often dubbed the Battle of the Begums, continued. The Hasina government abolished the provision of caretaker government in the constitution through the controversial Fifteenth Amendment. The move was seen by the BNP as an attempt to corrupt the election process in favour of the League.

In 2013, the hard-line, right-wing, Islamic party, Jamaat-e-Islami was banned from registering and therefore contesting in elections by the High Court, citing their charter violates the constitution. Street violence between the League, BNP and the Jamaat intensified in the run up to the general election. In 2014, the general elections were boycotted by the BNP. The elections were criticized by the United States, United Kingdom, European Union and the United Nations. Sheikh Hasina was sworn in for a third tenure as prime minister.

In 2015 and 2016, Bangladesh saw increasing assassinations targeting minorities and secularists, including Hindus, Buddhists, Christians, Western and Asian expatriates, LGBT activists, Sufi Muslims, bloggers, publishers and atheists. The country's worst terrorist attack saw the death of 20 people after an upmarket restaurant was sieged by gunmen in July 2016. The Islamic State of Iraq and Levant has claimed responsibility for many of the attacks, although the Hasina government insists local terror outfits are more likely to be responsible. Since this attack, the Government took stricter measures against extremists as the security forces led a numerous raids on suspected militant hide-outs. The measures led to reduction in extremist attacks and fatalities.

In 2017 the country faced fresh challenge from incoming Rohingya refugees. Starting in early August 2017, the Myanmar security forces began "clearance operations" against the Rohingya in northern Rakhine state — killing thousands of Rohingya, brutalizing thousands more, and driving hundreds of thousands out of the country into neighboring Bangladesh. In the first four weeks of the conflict, over 400,000 Rohingya refugees (approximately 40% of the remaining Rohingya in Myanmar) fled the country on foot or by boat (chiefly to Bangladesh) creating a major humanitarian crisis. The governments of Myanmar and Bangladesh signed a memorandum of understanding on 23 November 2017 regarding the repatriation of Rohingya refugees to Rakhine State. However, till the end of the decade over 740,000 refugees remained in Bangladesh creating pressure on the country's economy and infrastructure.

The 2018 General elections brought another landslide victory for the Awami League led by Sheikh Hasina. While the opposition was already weak due to key leaders being in either jail or exile, the elections were further marred by violence and claims of vote rigging. However, this gave the Awami League Government stability and opportunity to complete key infrastructure projects for the country including the Padma Bridge and the Dhaka Metro Rail.

Administrative Division
 With the introduction of Rangpur Division in 2010 and Mymensingh Division in 2015, by the end of the decade the country was divided into eight divisions shown in the table below:

As shown in the table above, these divisions were further subdivided into 64 districts.

Demographics

Based on World Development Indicators published by the World Bank the population of Bangladesh grew from 150 million at the beginning of the decade to 161 million by the end. This signifies an annual population growth rate of 0.7%. Population density increased from 1156 to 1240 per sq. km. The urban population was 30.5% of the total at the beginning, which ended up at 36.6%. Dhaka, the largest city, with a population of 14.7 million, accounted for 31.8% of the total urban population by 2019. Age dependency ratio (% of working-age population) changed from 58.2% to 49.0% by the end of the decade.

The influx of Rohingya refugees had impact on the demography of Bangladesh. From 25 August to 25 October 2017, around 605,000 Rohingyas arrived in Cox’s Bazar.Reported by the Cox’s Bazar District Commissioner Office Besides, almost 203,431 Rohingya refugees were already living at Ukhiya and Teknaf Upazila of Cox’s Bazar, and they had come there during the period from July 2005 to August 2017.Report on the Relief Distribution to Myanmar Nationals in Cox’s Bazar, Memorandum No. 51.01.2200.000.24.016.17–555 The total number of Rohingya refugees staying in Bangladesh by the end of the decade was about 1,008,431.Center for Policy Dialogue, 2017

Climate

Natural disasters

In 2012 floods and landslides caused by heavy rain in late June, which significantly affected ten districts in the country's northern and south-eastern parts causing 131 deaths. In August–September 2014, continuous rainfall in north and north-eastern Bangladesh caused flash floods in low-lying and densely populated areas affecting 2.8 million people. On 21 May 2016, Cyclone Roanu made landfall near Chittagong, Bangladesh. 30 people died when this cyclone hit the county, and around 40,000 homesteads and business houses were damaged.

In 2017 Cyclone Mora made landfall on May 31. Strong winds and storm surge battered buildings and destroyed farmlands across Chittagong, Cox's Bazar, and Rangamati. At least 20,000 houses were damaged in refugee camps for Rohingya Muslims, who were displaced by conflict in neighbouring Myanmar. Continued monsoon rain later in the year caused flooding which covered approximately one-third of Bangladesh, primarily in the northern, north-eastern, and central parts of the country. Over six million have been affected, according to UNICEF, with estimates ranging as high as 8.5 million. Property losses included nearly 700,000 damaged or destroyed homes,  of farmland inundated, and thousands of miles of damaged roads. On 12 June, heavy monsoon rain triggered a series of landslides and floods in  Rangamati, Chittagong and Bandarban - three hilly districts of Bangladesh - and killed at least 152 people.

Awards and Recognitions
 A.H.M. Noman Khan, a community leader promoting the cause of disabled people, was awarded Ramon Magsaysay Award in 2010.
 Fazle Hasan Abed, founder of BRAC, was awarded Honorary Knighthood by the Queen Elizabeth II in 2010.
 Muhammad Yunus, founder of Grameen Bank, was presented Congressional Gold Medal awarded by United States Congress in 2010.
 Syeda Rizwana Hasan, a lawyer promoting environment protection, was awarded Ramon Magsaysay Award in 2012.
 Sir Fazle Hasan Abed, Founder of BRAC, wins the World Food Prize in 2015.

Culture

Literature
The countries' most popular author of the time, Humayun Ahmed, died in 2012. His unexpected and untimely death was mourned widely and it created an "emotionally unifying experience" for the nation. In 2016 the country further lost another leading critically acclaimed poet and author Syed Shamsul Haque. These two deaths created a vacuum in the literary field of Bangladesh. Some of the notable literary works from this decade include: Abdullah Abu Sayeed's Amar Boka Shoishob, Muntassir Mamoon's Dusshomoyer Dinguli, Humayun Ahmed's Badshah Namdar; Tahmima Anam's The Good Muslim and Imdadul Haq Milan's ''Ekattor O Ekjon Maa.

Visual arts

Baitur Rauf Mosque completed in 2012, designed by Bangladeshi architect Marina Tabassum, was one of six winners of the Aga Khan Award for Architecture in 2016, along with the Friendship Centre in Gaibandha. Other prominent architects who made notable contribution in this decade include Jalal Ahmad, Salauddin Ahmed, Saif Ul Haque, Ehsan Khan, Mubasshar Hussein, Mustapha Khalid Palash, Enamul Karim Nirjhar and Rafiq Azam. In this decade the nation mourned the death of master architect Muzharul Islam (d. 2012) who is considered as the pioneer of modern architecture in Bangladesh.

See also
Years in Bangladesh in the decade of

References

 
2010s decade overviews